When Maryam Spoke Out is a 2001 Lebanese film directed by Assad Fouladkar and based on a true event that happened in Lebanon.

It is a social story about a couple, Ziad and Maryam, who lead a happy marriage, except for the fact that after three years of marriage Maryam has still not had a baby. Her husband Ziad is compassionate and assures her, that he still loves her. Nonetheless, Maryam cannot escape the growing pressure from the family, especially from her mother-in-law. She reacts to it in her own way with a false pregnancy. The initial enthusiasm and care is quickly gone when it becomes clear they are not really expecting a baby.

When Maryam Spoke Out is Fouladkar's first feature film.

Synopsis
After three years of happily married life, Ziyad and Maryam feel the social pressure to have a child. Their previously happy relationship becomes poisoned when it is discovered that Maryam is infertile.

Cast and characters
Bernadette Hodeib as  Maryam
Talal El-Jordi as Ziyad
Renée Dik
Umaya Lahoud
Joseph Abu-Dames
Randa Alam

Awards
Best performance by an actress for Bernadette Hodeib at the sixth Biennale des Cinemas Arabes, 2002, Paris, France.
Best Film and Best performance by an actress for Bernadette Hodeib at the Carthage Film Festival, 2002, Carthage, Tunisia.
Best Film and Best performance by an actress for Bernadette Hodeib at the Alexandria Film Festival, Egypt 
Best actress for Bernadette Hodeib, Critics Award and the Golden Dagger for Assad Fouladkar at the Muscat Film Festival, 2003, Amman.

References

External links
 

2001 films
2001 drama films
2000s Arabic-language films
Lebanese drama films